The following is a list of Greek organizations at Vanderbilt University.

National Pan-Hellenic Council
Alpha Kappa Alpha
Alpha Phi Alpha
Delta Sigma Theta
Kappa Alpha Psi
Phi Beta Sigma
Sigma Gamma Rho
Zeta Phi Beta

North American Interfraternity Conference
Alpha Epsilon Pi
Alpha Tau Omega
Beta Theta Pi
Kappa Alpha Order
Kappa Sigma
Phi Gamma Delta
Pi Kappa Alpha
Sigma Chi
Sigma Nu
Zeta Beta Tau

National Panhellenic Conference
Alpha Chi Omega
Alpha Delta Pi
Chi Omega
Delta Delta Delta
Kappa Alpha Theta
Kappa Delta
Kappa Kappa Gamma
Pi Beta Phi
Zeta Tau Alpha

Honor Society
Order of Omega

References

External links
Vanderbilt University Office of Greek Life

Vanderbilt
Vanderbilt University